Ofer Samra is an artist (painter) and actor who has resided in Venice, California. Samra is also active as a film producer, screenwriter and "Fitness and Lifestyle Coach." He was born in Israel in 1963 and moved to the United States in 1986.

Achievement

Art Exhibitions:

2014/2015

-QART.Com Gallery
-Flower+Hewes Gallery

2013/2014

-LA Art Show
-Palm Springs Art Show
-Ohr HaTorah Synagogue
-Axiom Gallery/Los Angeles

2012/2013

-Art Basel, Miami Beach
-San Francisco International Arts Festival
-Hampton's Art Show

2011

-Soho Gallery, Studio City
-Affordable Art Fair, New York City
- LA Art Fair (Lurie Gallery)

Fitness and Bodybuilding:

1987 Palm Springs Bodybuilding Champion – 1st and Overall
1991 Orange County Bodybuilding Classic – 3rd Heavy weight
1992 Los Angeles Bodybuilding Champion – 2nd Heavyweight
1994 Amateur Grand Prix – 2nd Heavyweight
1994 Mr. California – 5th Heavyweight

Filmography

 Two of a Kind (2005), as Ofer
 My Name Is... (2005), as actor Jason Scott
 Irish Eyes (2004), as the Italian thug
 Envy (2004), as Pete
 Live from Baghdad (2002) (TV), as Iraqi Bomb Shelter Guard
 Ticker (2002), as Minion 1
 The Guest of Honor (2001), as the gardener
 Three Kings (1999), stunts
 Batman Forever (1995), as Harvey's Thug
 True Lies (1994), as Yusif

External links
Ofer Samra personal website
Samra artist website
Samra artist interview

1963 births
Living people
Israeli bodybuilders
Israeli emigrants to the United States
People from Venice, Los Angeles